Martín Gramática (born 27 November 1975) is an Argentine-born former American football placekicker in the National Football League (NFL) for the Tampa Bay Buccaneers, Indianapolis Colts, Dallas Cowboys, and New Orleans Saints. He played college football at Kansas State University where was recognized twice as an All-American and was drafted by the Tampa Bay Buccaneers in the third round of the 1999 NFL Draft.

Gramática is currently the head coach of the Tampa Bay Strikers in the National Indoor Soccer League.

Early years
Gramática was born in Buenos Aires, Argentina. At the age of nine, he moved with his family to the United States. The family settled in LaBelle, Florida, east of Fort Myers. He was only interested in playing soccer at LaBelle High School, but his kicking precision attracted the attention of the football coach of the school. He invited Gramática to try out as the team's kicker.

Gramática started to play American football during his senior year. He tallied 8-of-10 field goals, 22 extra points, and hit 38 of 49 kickoffs out of the end zone for touchbacks. His longest field goal was 52 yards.

College career
Gramática accepted a football scholarship from Kansas State University. As a freshman in 1994, he ranked eighth in the Big Eight Conference with 57 scored points, making 6-of-9 field goals (66.7%) and 38-of-39 extra points (97.4%).

As a sophomore in 1995, because of a very effective redzone offense, Gramática saw his field goal opportunities reduced, connecting in 7-of-10 field goals (70%) and 43-of-46 extra points (93.5%).

In 1996, Gramática was granted a medical redshirt, after tearing his right anterior cruciate ligament one week before the season opener.

As a junior in 1997, he posted 19-of-20 field goals (95%), 37-of-38 extra points (97.4%) and 94 scored points. He converted all three of his over 50-yard field goal attempts. He received the Lou Groza Award.

As a senior in 1998, he registered 22-of-31 field goals (71%) and 69-of-69 extra points (100%). He set the NCAA record for scoring by a kicker in a single-season with 135 points. He hit a 65-yard field goal against Northern Illinois University, which was the fourth-longest field goal in NCAA history, and the longest in NCAA history without the use of a tee. He finished in second place for the Lou Groza Award.

Gramática received his Bachelor of Science degree in social science from Kansas State in May 1999.

During his four seasons, he became the school's greatest placekicker. He made 54 out of 70 field goals and 187 of 192 point-after-touchdown attempts, gaining a school record of 349 points in four seasons. He set the single-season school record with 135 points and the longest field goal kicked from 65 yards. Those achievements earned him the nickname Automatica because whenever he attempted a field goal, it was taken for granted that it would be good.

In 2008, he was inducted into Kansas State's Ring of Honor. In 2013, he was inducted into the Kansas Sports Hall of Fame. In 2016, he was inducted into the Kansas State Athletics Hall of Fame.

Professional career

Tampa Bay Buccaneers
Gramática was selected by the Tampa Bay Buccaneers in the third round (80th overall) of the 1999 NFL Draft. As a rookie, he began the season by making 10 consecutive field goals. In the tenth game against the Atlanta Falcons, he kicked 4-of-4 field goal attempts with a long of 53 yards. He was NFC Special Teams Player of the Week for his game against Atlanta. He was the NFC Special Teams Player of the Month for November. He tallied 27-of-32 field goal attempts (84.4%), 27-of-27 extra points (100%) and 106 points (franchise record). He was named to the PFWA All-Rookie Team.

In 2000, he posted 28-of-34 field goals (82.4%), 42-of-42 extra points and scored 126 points (new franchise record). In the seventh game against the Detroit Lions, he kicked 4-of-4 field goal attempts with a long of 55 yards. He was the NFC Special Teams Player of the Month for October. He was NFC Special Teams Player of the Week for Week 15 against the Miami Dolphins. He was the starter for the NFC Pro Bowl team.

In 2001, he scored 23-of-29 field goals (79.3%), 28-of-28 extra points (100%) and 97 points. Although he was known for jumping in celebration after every successful field goal attempt, he stopped this practice after his younger brother Bill Gramática tore his right anterior cruciate ligament, while playing for the Arizona Cardinals and celebrating in a similar manner after kicking a field goal. In Week 12, he won NFC Special Teams Player of the Week for his game against the Cincinnati Bengals. In the fifteenth game against the New Orleans Saints, he kicked 4-of-4 field goal attempts with a long of 32 yards, before suffering a right hamstring strain in the second half. He missed the season finale against the Baltimore Ravens. In the 13-17 Wild Card Round against the Philadelphia Eagles, he kicked 3-of-3 field goal attempts.

In 2002, he tallied 32-of-39 field goals (82.1%), 32-of-32 extra points (100%). In the eighth game against the Carolina Panthers, he scored the 400th career point, while kicking 4-of-4 field goals with a long of 53 yards. He won NFC Special Teams Player of the Week for Weeks 8 and 17. He was the NFC Special Teams Player of the Month for December. He was a part of the winning Super Bowl XXXVII team, making two field goals and six extra points for 12 points, while also becoming the first Argentine born player to be a part of the final game. Gramática gained popularity that allowed him to sign exclusive contracts to make advertisement campaigns for diverse companies. The $14,500,000-contract signed with the Buccaneers in 2002 ranked him among the best-paid Argentine sportsmen after footballers Hernán Crespo, Juan Verón, and Gabriel Batistuta.

In 2003, Gramática had a noticeable drop in accuracy in field goals of 40 yards or longer (4-of-11 for 36%). He collected 16-of-26 field goals (61.5%), 33-of-34 extra points and 81 points. In the fifth game against the Washington Redskins, he converted 5-of-5 extra points.

In 2004, his accuracy problems continued, registering 11-of-19 field goal (57.9%) and 21-of-22 extra points (95.5%) attempts. He did not make a field goal longer than 22 yards after the fifth game against the New Orleans Saints. In the eleventh game against the Carolina Panthers, he missed three field goal attempts (one was blocked), contributing to a 14-21 loss. He only connected on two of his last nine field goal attempts (22%). He was released two days later on 30 November and replaced with Jay Taylor.

Indianapolis Colts (first stint)
On 8 December 2004, he was signed by the Indianapolis Colts as a kickoff specialist, to complement kicker Mike Vanderjagt who had a groin injury, while reuniting with his former head coach Tony Dungy. He appeared in four games and averaged 61.8 yards per kickoff. He was not re-signed after the season.

In September 2005, Gramática revealed in an interview with The News-Press of Fort Myers, that he believed the reason for his struggles the previous two seasons was because of torn muscles in his lower adductor and lower abdomen, which he had surgically repaired during the offseason. However, his rehabilitation was not completed until after the 2005 season started, and he remained out of football while rehabbing.

New England Patriots
On 6 April 2006, the New England Patriots signed him as a possible replacement for veteran Adam Vinatieri, who signed as a free agent with the Indianapolis Colts. Gramática competed with rookie fourth-round draft pick Stephen Gostkowski for the position. He made his only two preseason attempts against the Atlanta Falcons. He was released on 23 August.

Indianapolis Colts (second stint)
On 22 September, Gramática returned to the Colts for depth purposes, after Adam Vinatieri suffered a groin injury. He appeared in three games, making one field goal of 20 yards and three extra points against the New York Jets. He was released on 9 October.

Dallas Cowboys
On 27 November 2006, Gramática was signed by the Dallas Cowboys, after the team released veteran Mike Vanderjagt. On 3 December, in his debut with the team, he kicked the game-winning 46-yard field goal against the New York Giants.

In the 20-21 Wild Card Round loss against the Seattle Seahawks, he made 2-of-2 field goals and 2-of-2 extra points. He also became part of Cowboys lore on fourth-and-one with 1:19 left in the game, Gramática was going to attempt a 19-yard field goal for the go ahead score, when starter Tony Romo the holder for the kick, fumbled the snap, recovered the ball and attempted to run it for either a touchdown or a first down, but was tackled short of the first down marker, and turned the ball over on the Seattle 2-yard line.

On 5 March 2007, Gramática signed a two-year extension with the Cowboys. He was passed on the depth chart by rookie Nick Folk during the preseason. After being placed on injured reserve with a strained right hamstring on 1 September, he was released on 25 September.

New Orleans Saints
On 12 December 2007, Gramática was signed by the New Orleans Saints to handle the kicking duties for the final three games, after kicker Olindo Mare was injured. On 23 December, he matched his personal long field goal mark of 55 yards just before halftime in a pivotal game against the Philadelphia Eagles. He made 5-of-5 field goal (100%) and 8-of-8 extra points (100%) attempts.

In the 2008 preseason, he was challenged by sixth-round draft pick Taylor Mehlhaff for the team's placekicking job. Gramática remained the starter as Mehlhaff was waived by the Saints on 30 August during the final roster cuts. Gramática was perfect until 21 September, when he missed two critical field goals in a loss to the Denver Broncos. On 6 October, he had a blocked field goal that was returned for a touchdown and a missed 46-yard field goal just before the two-minute warning in a loss to the Minnesota Vikings. Just two days after the game against Minnesota, Gramática was placed on season-ending injured reserve with a groin injury on 8 October and the team re-signed Mehlhaff. He finished with 6-of-10 field goals (60%) and 16-of-16 extra points (100%).

Personal life
His younger brother, Bill, was also a kicker in the NFL. On 25 July 2022, it was announced the Gramática would serve as the Head Coach for the newly-announced Tampa Bay Strikers of the National Indoor Soccer League (NISL).

References

Notes

External links

1975 births
Living people
All-American college football players
American football placekickers
Argentine emigrants to the United States
Argentine players of American football
Dallas Cowboys players
Indianapolis Colts players
Kansas State Wildcats football players
National Conference Pro Bowl players
New England Patriots players
New Orleans Saints players
People from Hendry County, Florida
Players of American football from Florida
Sportspeople from Buenos Aires
Tampa Bay Buccaneers players
LaBelle High School alumni
Argentine football managers
American soccer coaches